King's Seat (Scottish Gaelic: Ceann Sidhe) is one of the principal hills of the Sidlaw range in South East Perthshire.   At , it is classified as a Marilyn.  King's Seat is located near Collace and is adjacent to Black Hill and the smaller Dunsinan, made famous by its mention in Shakespeare's play Macbeth.

References

External links 
 King's Seat site information at CANMORE, Historic Environment Scotland

Mountains and hills of Perth and Kinross
Marilyns of Scotland